Cecilia Chung is a civil rights leader and activist for LGBT rights, HIV/AIDS awareness, health advocacy, and social justice. She is a trans woman, and her life story was one of four main storylines in the 2017 ABC miniseries When We Rise about LGBT rights in the 1970s and 1980s.

Early life 
Cecilia was born in Hong Kong in 1965 and later immigrated to Los Angeles with her family in 1984. A year later, she moved to San Francisco to attend City College of San Francisco before transferring to Golden Gate University in 1987 with a degree in international management. Afterwards, she spent a few years working as a court interpreter for Santa Clara County and a sales trainer at a financial company.

Activism 
Cecilia has spent much of her adult life advocating for health-related issues affecting the LGBT community, including working as an HIV test counselor at UCSF AIDS Health Project, HIV Program Coordinator at API American Health Forum, and Deputy Director at the Transgender Law Center.  Additionally, Cecilia is the first transgender woman and first Asian to be elected to lead the board of directors of the San Francisco Lesbian, Gay, Bisexual, and Transgender Pride Celebration and the first transgender woman and the first person living openly with HIV to chair the San Francisco Human Rights Commission.

Cecilia founded San Francisco Transgender Advocacy and Mentorship (SF TEAM) to provide events for the transgender community through the San Francisco LGBT Community Center. She is also one of the founders of the annual Trans March.

In 2013, Cecilia was appointed to the Health Commission by Mayor Edward Lee. She made headlines for making San Francisco the first city in the United States to pay for gender reassignment surgery for uninsured transgender patients. Through her appointment, she was also able to train San Francisco Department of Public Health staff members about transgender issues in programming called “Transgender 101”.

The same year, Cecilia was appointed by President Barack Obama to the Presidential Advisory Council on HIV/AIDS, where she served two full terms and resigned from the council before the inauguration of President Donald Trump. 

For the 2014 AIDS Conference, Cecilia published an article titled "HIV: a call for solidarity with the transgender community," in which she shared a personal encounter with police abuse and emphasized the importance of inclusivity and unity within the trans women community.

Cecilia is the Director of Evaluation and Strategic Initiatives at the Transgender Law Center, and the former chair of the US PL HIV Caucus.

Personal life 
In 1992, Cecilia decided to transition. She became estranged from her family due to their lack of understanding about her being transgender. She also had to resign from her sales trainer job to facilitate the process. She relied on her court interpreter job as her sole source of income, but her employment contract was soon terminated after a judge noticed her physical changes due to transition. She eventually ended up living on the streets and had to resort to sex work for livelihood, which subjected her to sexual and physical violence. She also turned to drugs for self-medication. In the same year, she was diagnosed as HIV positive.

In 1995, almost 3 years after becoming homeless, Cecilia was stabbed during a sexual assault attempt and taken to the emergency room. Her mother, who was the emergency contact, came to the hospital for a visit and the two reconciled. Since then, Cecilia completed her gender reassignment surgery in Bangkok in 1998.

Honors and awards

 Transgender Discrimination Task Force in 1994
 1998: San Francisco Lesbian Gay Bisexual Transgender Pride Celebration Committee
 2001: First Asian and first transgender woman elected to SF LGBT Pride Celebration Committee Board President
 2001: Asian & Pacific Islander Wellness Center Board of Directors
2011: Civil Rights Enforcement Working Group
 2012: Received the Levi Strauss & Co. Pioneer Award.
 2013: Appointed to the Health Commission by Mayor Lee
 2019: Commended by the San Francisco Board of Supervisors during Transgender Awareness Week
 San Francisco AIDS Foundation Cleve Jones Award
 Human Rights Campaign Community Service Award
 California Woman of The Year
 Out and Equal Champion of the Year Award
 2020: NAAAP100 Award

Other 

Ivory Aquino plays Cecilia in the miniseries about LGBT rights called When We Rise.

References

External links

1965 births
Living people
American people of Hong Kong descent
HIV/AIDS activists
Hong Kong emigrants to the United States
American LGBT people of Asian descent
American LGBT rights activists
LGBT people from California
Hong Kong transgender people
Activists from San Francisco
People with HIV/AIDS
Transgender women
Transgender rights activists
Golden Gate University alumni
21st-century Hong Kong LGBT people
LGBT people from San Francisco